JSX may refer to:

 JSX (airline), independent regional airline in the United States
 JSX (rapper), French rapper
 Jakarta Stock Exchange, was a stock exchange based in Jakarta, Indonesia, before it merged with the Surabaya Stock Exchange to form the Indonesia Stock Exchange
JSX Composite (officially named IDX Composite), an index of all stocks listed on the Indonesia Stock Exchange
 JSX (JavaScript) or JavaScript XML, an XML-like syntax extension of JavaScript